Stenders is a surname. Notable people with the surname include:

Kriv Stenders, Australian writer and film director
Rob Stenders (born 1965), Dutch radio DJ

See also
Stenders Quarry, Gloucestershire, England
A shortened name of EastEnders
Stender (disambiguation)